Margab may refer to:
 Margat, Syria
 Margav, Iran